Paul Joseph Regina Jr. (October 25, 1956 – January 31, 2006) was an American actor and occasional screenwriter. He is best known for his role as Cliff Waters in the sitcom Brothers (1984–1989), as well as his roles as Felix Echeverria in the legal drama L.A. Law (1988–1992) and Frank Nitti in The Untouchables (1993–1994).

Early life and education 
Paul Joseph Regina Jr. was born in Brooklyn, New York, the son of Irma (née Manjarrez), an Internal Revenue Service employee, and Paul Joseph Regina, a tradesman. Raised in Medford, New York, he graduated from Patchogue-Medford High School in 1974 after appearing in several school plays and musicals.

Career 
Regina began working professionally on stage in an off-Broadway production of The World of Sholom Aleichem in 1976. He played Kenickie in a national touring company of the musical Grease, and later appeared briefly in the Broadway production. He appeared in several additional plays in both Los Angeles and New York City throughout his career.

He began appearing on television in 1978 in the series Police Woman. He had starring roles in the television series Joe & Valerie from 1978 to 1979 with Char Fontane and Zorro and Son in 1983 with Henry Darrow.

He is perhaps best known for his portrayal of gay sibling Cliff Waters, with Robert Walden and Brandon Maggart as his two brothers, and Philip Charles MacKenzie as his best friend, in Showtime's groundbreaking 1980s sitcom Brothers, which was the first American sitcom with homosexual main characters that dealt with homosexuality in a real way. The show ran from 1984 until 1989.

He appeared in several made-for-television movies and had guest appearances on a variety of television series. He also had a recurring role in six episodes of L.A. Law as attorney Felix Echeverria, from 1988 to 1992, and went on to appear in fifteen episodes of the 1993–1994 series The Untouchables, playing Frank Nitti, one of Al Capone's top henchmen.

As a writer, he co-wrote the screenplay for the 2001 film Marie with its director, Fred Carpenter. He also penned the 2006 film Eddie Monroe, co-writing the screenplay with Fred Carpenter, Craig Weintraub (writing as Craig Morris), and Thom Ross. He was one of three screenwriters (the others being Fred Carpenter and Joanne Tamburro) for Just Like Joe, released in 2008. He collaborated again with Fred Carpenter and Joanne Tamburro on the story for the 2011 film Jesse, released after his death.

Personal life and death 
Regina was married to Nancy Dye, his teacher in an improv workshop, from 1990 until his death in 2006. They had a daughter, Nicolette.

After spending more than 20 years in Hollywood, he returned to his boyhood home of Medford, New York and be with his family.

Regina died of liver cancer in Smithtown, New York on January 31, 2006, at the age of 49.

Filmography

Author 
 Marie (Screenplay, 2001)
 Eddie Monroe (Screenplay, 2006)
 Just Like Joe (Screenplay, 2008)
 Jesse (Story, 2011)

Stage 
 The World of Sholom Aleichem (Roundabout Theatre, New York City, 1976)
 Grease (Broadway production and U.S. tour, 1976)
 A Hundred Percent Alive (Westwood Playhouse, Los Angeles, 1979)
 Mississippi Blue (Los Angeles Actors Theatre, Los Angeles)
 Two Outs Bottom of the Ninth (McCadden Place Theatre, Los Angeles, 1983)
 Wrestlers (Cast Theatre, Los Angeles, 1985)
 Grand Junction (Coast Playhouse, Los Angeles, 1988)
 The Sisters (Pasadena Playhouse, Los Angeles, 1995)

References

External links 
 

1956 births
2006 deaths
20th-century American male actors
21st-century American male actors
21st-century American screenwriters
American male film actors
American male stage actors
American male television actors
American male screenwriters
Male actors from New York (state)
Screenwriters from New York (state)
Writers from Brooklyn
Deaths from liver cancer
21st-century American male writers
20th-century American male writers
20th-century American screenwriters